Valcourt, Quebec refers to two distinct entities:
Valcourt (township), a township municipality in Quebec, Canada
Valcourt (city), a city enclaved within the township